The district of Epping Forest is in the county of Essex in England. It was created on 1 April 1974, following the merger of Epping Urban District, Chigwell Urban District, Waltham Holy Cross Urban District, and part of Epping and Ongar Rural District.

Until 2002, Epping Forest District Council was represented by 59 councillors. In 2002 the ward boundaries were reorganised, resulting in the loss of one council seat, and since then the district has had 58 councillors representing 32 wards. Each ward is represented by one, two or three councillors, depending on the ward's population, so that each councillor represents a roughly equal proportion of the district's electorate.

Councillors serve for a four-year term. They are elected on a "cycle of thirds", i.e. one third of the Council is elected each year, followed by one year without election.

Political control
Since the foundation of the council in 1974 political control of the council has been held by the following parties:

Leadership
The leaders of the council since 2001 have been:

District council wards since 2002
Broadley Common, Epping Upland & Nazeing (1 seat)
Buckhurst Hill East (2 seats)
Buckhurst Hill West (3 seats)
Chigwell Row (1 seat)
Chigwell Village (2 seats)
Chipping Ongar, Greening & Marden Ash (2 seats)
Epping Hemnall (3 seats)
Epping Lindsey & Thornwood Common (3 seats)
Grange Hill (3 seats)
Hastingwood, Matching & Sheering Village (1 seat)
High Ongar, Willingale & The Rodings (1 seat)
Lambourne (1 seat)
Loughton Alderton (2 seats)
Loughton Broadway (2 seats)
Loughton Fairmead (2 seats)
Loughton Forest (2 seats)
Loughton Roding (2 seats)
Loughton St John's (2 seats)
Loughton St Mary's (2 seats)
Lower Nazeing (2 seats)
Lower Sheering (1 seat)
Moreton & Fyfield (1 seat)
North Weald Bassett (2 seats)
Passingford (1 seat)
Roydon (1 seat)
Shelley (1 seat)
Theydon Bois (2 seats)
Waltham Abbey High Beach (1 seat)
Waltham Abbey Honey Lane (3 seats)
Waltham Abbey North East (2 seats)
Waltham Abbey Paternoster (2 seats)
Waltham Abbey South West (2 seats)

Council elections
1973 Epping Forest District Council election
1976 Epping Forest District Council election
1979 Epping Forest District Council election (New ward boundaries)
1980 Epping Forest District Council election
1982 Epping Forest District Council election
1983 Epping Forest District Council election
1984 Epping Forest District Council election
1986 Epping Forest District Council election
1987 Epping Forest District Council election (District boundary changes took place but the number of seats remained the same)
1988 Epping Forest District Council election
1990 Epping Forest District Council election (District boundary changes took place but the number of seats remained the same)
1991 Epping Forest District Council election
1992 Epping Forest District Council election
1994 Epping Forest District Council election (District boundary changes took place but the number of seats remained the same)
1995 Epping Forest District Council election (District boundary changes took place but the number of seats remained the same)
1996 Epping Forest District Council election
1998 Epping Forest District Council election
1999 Epping Forest District Council election
2000 Epping Forest District Council election
2002 Epping Forest District Council election (New ward boundaries reduced the number of seats by 1)
2003 Epping Forest District Council election
2004 Epping Forest District Council election
2006 Epping Forest District Council election
2007 Epping Forest District Council election
2008 Epping Forest District Council election
2010 Epping Forest District Council election
2011 Epping Forest District Council election
2012 Epping Forest District Council election (Some new ward boundaries)
2014 Epping Forest District Council election
2015 Epping Forest District Council election
2016 Epping Forest District Council election
2018 Epping Forest District Council election
2019 Epping Forest District Council election
2021 Epping Forest District Council election

Results since 2002

Changes between elections

1995 boundaries

2002 boundaries

2005-2009

2012 boundaries 
Independent Cllr David Dorrell (Waltham Abbey Paternoster, elected UKIP, 2014) joined the Conservatives in February 2018.

Independent Cllr Sylvia Watson (Buckhurst Hill West, elected Conservative, 2014) resigned in March 2018. The seat is due for election on 3 May.

LRA Cllr Leon Girling (Loughton Broadway, elected 2016) resigned in March 2018. There is another vacancy in the same ward. A double by-election will be held on 3 May.

Conservative Cllr Tony Boyce (Moreton and Fyfield, elected 2015) resigned in March 2018. A by-election will be held on 3 May.

Conservative Cllr Glynis Shiell (Waltham Abbey Honey Lane, elected 2016) resigned in March 2018. There is another vacancy in the same ward. A double by-election will be held on 3 May.

See also
Politics of Loughton

References

External links
Election pages on Epping Forest District Council website
By-election results

 
Epping Forest District
Council elections in Essex
District council elections in England